Belavantra is a village in Dharwad district of Karnataka, India.

Demographics
As of the 2011 Census of India there were 528 households in Belavantra and a total population of 2,474 consisting of 1,254 males and 1,220 females. There were 347 children ages 0-6.

References

Villages in Dharwad district